A duckbill, bearpaw or cow's mouth was a style of shoe with a broad toe which was fashionable in the 15th and 16th centuries.  This style started with Charles VIII of France, who had an extra toe, and was later worn by Henry VIII of England.  It replaced the excessively long toe of the crakow but also tended to become impractical, as it became enlarged with stuffing and horns and so could be a foot wide, giving the wearer a waddling gait.  It might also be adorned with slashes to show the fine lining and sumptuary laws were introduced to restrict all these excesses.

There is a surviving design for a duckbill shoe by Albrecht Dürer; he describes it as made on an absolutely straight, symmetric last, and as having an entirely flat sole of two thicknesses of leather. They were also to have straps over the instep.

References

Historical footwear